Nam Chang-hee (born February 14, 1957) is a South Korean plasma physicist. Nam is specializing in the exploration of relativistic laser-matter interactions using femtosecond PW lasers. Currently he is professor of physics at Gwangju Institute of Science and Technology and director of the Center for Relativistic Laser Science as a part of the Institute for Basic Science (IBS).

Biography
Nam studied nuclear engineering at Seoul National University, where he obtained his B.Sc. in 1977. After that he received a M.Sc. in physics from the Korea Advanced Institute of Science and Technology (KAIST) in 1979. Entering the classroom as an instructor, he taught as in Pusan National University until 1982. Enrolling in Princeton University, he moved to the United States where he later received a Ph.D. in plasma physics in 1988. He stayed in Princeton for a year working as a staff research physicist at the Princeton Plasma Physics Laboratory.

In 1989, he began working as an assistant professor in the Department of Physics in KAIST, where he was promoted to associate professor in 1992 and full professor in 1998. From 1999, he was also director of the Coherent X-ray Research Center at KAIST where he researched ultrafast laser science. He left KAIST in 2012 to become a professor at the Department of Physics and Photon Science at Gwangju Institute of Science and Technology (GIST) and the founding director of the Center for Relativistic Laser Science, a research center at GIST with funding provided by the Institute for Basic Science.

Academic work
Nam has published more than 120 journal papers and gives invited talks in international conferences. He served as a steering committee member of OECD Global Science Forum on Compact High-Intensity Short-Pulse Lasers (2001-2003) that eventually became ICUIL (Int. Comm. on Ultra-high Intensity Lasers) - a working group of IUPAP, and is a scientific advisory committee member of ELI - ALPS (Extreme Light Infrastructure/ Attosecond Light Pulse Source) – the EU program for the PW laser facility in Hungary started from 2011.

He has served as conference chairs (ICXRL in 2010, ISUILS in 2012), organizing chairs (APLS in 2008, 2010, 2012) or program chairs (CLEO-Pacific Rim in 2007, 2009). He is on the editorial boards of J. Phys. B as an international advisory committee member since 2007 and as a guest editor in 2012; IEEE Photonics Journal as an associate editor (from 2009 to 2011). He has represented Korea in international committees (ICQE from 2005 to 2012; CLEO-PR from 2012; Commission on Quantum Electronics of IUPAP since 2008). He has been instrumental in launching the Asian Intense Laser Network in 2004, serving as the first secretary

Awards
 2020: Presidential Citation, Government Science Day Award, Ministry of Science and ICT
 2011: Sungdo Optical Science Award of the Optical Society Korea
 2010: National Academy of Sciences Award, Korea
 2009: Fellow of the Optical Society of America 
 2008: Fellow of the American Physical Society

Further reading

External links
IBS Center for Relativistic Laser Science home page: http://corels.ibs.re.kr
http://www.gist.ac.kr/

References 

21st-century physicists
Optical physicists
South Korean physicists
Academic staff of KAIST
Academic staff of Gwangju Institute of Science and Technology
Princeton University alumni
KAIST alumni
Seoul National University alumni
People from Gwangju
Living people
Institute for Basic Science
Plasma physicists
1957 births